Bossingham is a large hamlet in the parish of Upper Hardres and the district of the City of Canterbury, Kent, England. It is located about five miles (8 km) south of Canterbury, and 2 miles (3.2 km) north of Stelling Minnis on a parallel road to the Roman road of Stone Street (the B2068 road).

There is one public house – the Hop Pocket, named after the large sacks in which hops were transported. The nearest general store and post office are in Stelling Minnis.

External links

Hamlets in Kent